JC may refer to:

Airlines
JC International Airlines, Cambodia
Japan Air Commuter (IATA code: JC)
JAL Express (1998–2014; IATA: JC), Japan
Rocky Mountain Airways (1965–1991; IATA: JC), United States

Arts and media
"JC" (song), a 1996 song by Powderfinger
J.C. (film), a 1972 American action film
The Jewish Chronicle, a national British Jewish newspaper

People

Jesus Christ
A shortening for French given name Jean-Claude

In arts and entertainment
JC (singer) (born 1998), Chinese singer
JC Chasez (born 1976), American musician
JC de Vera (born 1986), Filipino actor
JC Santos (born 1988), Filipino actor
J. C. Schütz (born 1976), Swedish singer, songwriter musician
James Cameron (born 1954), Canadian film director and writer
Jeassy (1936–2001), Indian film director and actor
John Campbell-Mac (born 1973), British actor and producer

In politics and government
J. C. Watts (born 1957), American politician and former professional Canadian football player
Jeremy Corbyn (born 1949), former leader of the British Labour Party
Julius Caesar (100–44 BC), Roman General, consul and statesman
Jimmy Carter (born 1924), 39th President of the United States

In sport
J. C. Hassenauer (born 1994), American football player
JC Intal (born 1983), Filipino professional basketball player
J. C. Jackson (born 1995), American football player
J. C. Watts (born 1957), American politician and former professional Canadian football player

In other fields
J. C. Daniel (1893–1975), Indian naturalist and author
J. C. Hurewitz (1914–2008), historian

Fictional characters
John Connor (born 1985), leader of the resistance in the Terminator franchise
JC Denton, a fictional character in the computer game Deus Ex
Joe Chill, the mugger who killed Batman's parents in stories published by DC Comics

Schools
Jamaica College, a boys' high school in Kingston, Jamaica
Jamestown College, the former name of the University of Jamestown in Jamestown, North Dakota
Jones College (Jacksonville), a private college in Jacksonville, Florida
Junior college, a type of two-year school of higher education

Other uses
JC virus, a type of human polyomavirus
Jersey City, New Jersey
Judeo-Christian, a term grouping Judaism and Christianity together
An emblem of a clothing line by
Jackie Chan

See also
Jaycee (disambiguation)
Roda JC, a Dutch football club